Atlantis is a fixed shooter video game released by Imagic in July 1982 for the Atari 2600. It was written by Dennis Koble who also wrote Trick Shot, Solar Storm, and Shootin' Gallery for Imagic. Atlantis was ported to the Atari 8-bit computers, VIC-20, Intellivision, and the Magnavox Odyssey 2. The game was inspired by Taito's 1981 Colony 7 arcade game.

Atlantis was the subject of Destination Atlantis, a video game competition in which players of the Atari 2600 version were encouraged to mail photos of their high scores to Imagic to receive a special edition of the game named Atlantis II.

Plot and gameplay 

The player controls the last defenses of the City of Atlantis against the Gorgon invaders. The city has seven bases, which are vulnerable to attack. Three of these have firepower capabilities to destroy the Gorgon ships before they manage to fire death rays at one of the settlements. The gun bases have fixed cannons; the center base fires straight up, while the far left and far right bases fire diagonally upwards across the screen. The center cannon also creates a shield that protects the settlements from the death rays, so once the center cannon is destroyed, the remaining settlements become vulnerable to attack. The enemy ships pass back and forth from left to right four times before they enter firing range, giving an ample opportunity to blow them away. Lost bases can be regained by destroying enough Gorgon ships.

Regardless of the player's efforts to avert the tragedy, Atlantis is doomed. The only way the game can end is when all bases are destroyed. However, a tiny ship then rises from the rubble and speeds away, making a connection with another Imagic game, Cosmic Ark.

The Intellivision version features two gun turrets with a movable cursor that can be aimed onto enemy ships. There is also a deploy-able ship to take on enemies one-on-one. The game features day, dusk, and night settings, with the night setting limiting visibility to two moving searchlights.

Destination Atlantis
Destination Atlantis was a competition held by Imagic in 1982.  Imagic invited players of Atlantis to take pictures of their high scores on their television screens and mail them to the company. Those who had the highest scores were then rewarded with a copy of Atlantis II. The latter game, rather than being a mass-produced sequel to Atlantis, was a special edition of the original featuring faster enemy ships which were worth fewer points. The concept behind this was to create a more difficult game that would "determine the true champion".  As very few cartridges were created, Atlantis II is now a rare and highly valued collectors item. Prices as of 2010 can reach US$6000.

Reception
According to Dennis Koble, over two million Atlantis cartridges were sold, and it was Imagic's second biggest selling game.

Video Games favorably reviewed the Intellivision version of Atlantis, calling it "a great shoot-'em-up for" the console. Antic liked the Atari 8-bit version's "very attractive and colorful" graphics, but said that gameplay "may take a bit of getting used to". The Atari 2600 version was a runner-up in the "Video Game of the Year" category at the 4th annual Arkie Awards.

Reviews
Games

References

External links
Atlantis at AtariAge
LiveVideo.com: Making of Atlantis Video Game

1982 video games
Imagic games
Fixed shooters
Atari 2600 games
Atari 8-bit family games
VIC-20 games
Intellivision games
Magnavox Odyssey 2 games
Atlantis in fiction
Video games developed in the United States
Multiplayer and single-player video games